Robostrider is a self-propelled robot which uses similar mechanisms to real water striders in order to glide along the surface of the water.  It was developed at Cambridge, Massachusetts.

Robostrider does not break the surface layer of the water despite leg speeds of  it generates both capillary waves and vortices while in motion, as do Gerridae.  Hu and Bush state that Robostrider moves "in a style less elegant than its natural counterpart"  but point out that it can cover  in five strides, with one winding.

See also
Animal locomotion on the surface layer of water.

References

External links
https://web.archive.org/web/20090907091706/http://web.mit.edu/chosetec/www/robo/robostrider.html

2003 robots
Biorobotics
Robots of the United States
Water walking robots